Ganti Mohana Chandra Balayogi (1 October 1951 – 3 March 2002) was an Indian lawyer and politician.

Growing up in a small Village, Balayogi had to travel to G.Vemavaram village for his primary education. He received his Post Graduate in Kakinada and a law degree from Andhra University, Visakhapatnam. He was serving as the speaker of 12th Lok Sabha when he died in a helicopter crash.

Early career
Balayogi began practicing law in 1980 in Kakinada under the guidance of Gopalaswamy Shetty, and in 1985, was selected as a First Class Magistrate. He then resigned from this post and returned to the bar to resume legal practice. In 1986, he took over as the Vice-Chairman of the Cooperative Town Bank of Kakinada, and in 1987, was elected as the Chairman of the East Godavari Zilla Praja Parishad. He was the First Dalit speaker in Loksabha.

Politics

In 1991, Balayogi was elected to the 10th Lok Sabha  under the Telugu Desam Party ticket. He lost this seat in the 1996 general elections, but continued political work in his community and was soon elected to the Andhra Pradesh Legislative Assembly in a by-election from the Mummidivaram Assembly constituency. Subsequently, he was appointed as the Minister of Higher Education in the Government of Andhra Pradesh.

In 1998, Balayogi was elected into parliament; he became the 12th Speaker of Lok Sabha (24 March 1998) and again for the 13th Lok Sabha (22 October 1999). As the Speaker, he chaired the Business Advisory Committee, Rules Committee, General Purposes Committee and Standing Committee of the Conference of Presiding Officers of Legislative Bodies in India, and he presided over the Indian Parliamentary Group, National Group of Inter-Parliamentary Union and India Branch of the Commonwealth Parliamentary Association. Along with these duties, Balayogi headed many Indian Parliamentary Delegations to foreign countries, while hosting visiting countries as well.

Death

On 3 March 2002, Balayogi died in crash of a Bell 206 helicopter in Kaikalur, Krishna District, Andhra Pradesh. The chopper, it began to lose height after returning from Bhimavaram. The rotor hit the crown of one of the many coconut palms in the area at Kovvadalanka village in Mandavalli mandal, 100 km from Vijayawada. The Speaker, his security officer D. Satya Raju and pilot Capt. G.B. Menon were killed on the spot. He was aged 50.

Legacy 
G.M.C. Balayogi Athletic Stadium was named in his memory.

References

External links
Lok Sabha Official Website: Biography
Dalistan.org: Biography 
Outlook India: Portraits

Balayogi
Balayogi
1951 births
2002 deaths
Victims of aviation accidents or incidents in India
India MPs 1998–1999
India MPs 1999–2004
Telugu Desam Party politicians
India MPs 1991–1996
Lok Sabha members from Andhra Pradesh
Andhra Pradesh district councillors
Andhra University alumni
People from East Godavari district